Events in the year 1537 in Norway.

Overview 
1537 is the year when Norway became a puppet state under the Danish Crown. Christian III did a coup d'état in Norway and made it a hereditary kingdom in a real union with Denmark that would last until 1814 when Frederick VI ceded the Kingdom of Norway to Charles XIII of Sweden. King Christian III also made by force Lutheranism state religion in Norway, and it was the state religion until 2012. 1537 is known as one of the darkest years in Norwegian history. Its also the start year for the early modern period in Norway (1537-1814), and the period known as The Puppet State era (lydriketiden) (1537-1660).

Incumbents
Monarch: Olav Engelbrektsson as Regent (until 1 April); then Christian III

Events
The Reformation in Norway:
January–February – The Commander of Bergenhus Fortress Eske Billes forces sacks farms of supporters of Archbishop Olav Engelbrektsson in Møre og Romsdal.
April 1 – The Archbishop of Norway Olav Engelbrektsson flees from Trondheim to Lier, Belgium.
April – Christian III sends a fleet with soldiers to Norway.
April – Steinvikholm Castle is besieged by the Protestant forces.
May 17 – The Archbishops men surrenders Steinvikholm Castle to the Protestant forces.
May – The forces sent by Christian III arrives in Norway. The army splits in two. One part plunders setesveins of Olav Engelbrektsson, the other part heads to Hamar to arrest Bishop Mogens Lauritssøn. 
June 20 – Siege of Hamar starts.
June 23 – Siege of Hamar ends with the arrest of Bishop Mogens Lauritssøn, and the Catholic rebellion is definitively ended in Norway.
September 2 – Gjeble Pederssøn becomes the first Lutheran bishop in Norway.

Full date unknown
Dissolution of all the monasteries in Norway, including:
Bakke Abbey
Munkeby Abbey
Tautra Abbey
Nidarholm Abbey
Gimsøy Abbey
Utstein Abbey

Arts and literature
 St. Olav's shrine was destroyed.

Births
Ludvig Munk, Stadtholder of Norway (d.1602)

Deaths

Probable
Hoskuld Hoskuldsson, Bishop of Stavanger (b. c. 1465/1470)

See also

References